Status (Latin plural: statūs), is a state, condition, or situation, and may refer to:

 Status (law) 
 Legal status, in law
 Political status, in international law
 Small entity status, in patent law
 Status conference
 Status crime
 Marital status
 Observer status, in international organizations
 Senior status
 Social status, in sociology
 Achieved status
 Ascribed status
 Master status
 Socioeconomic status
 Sociometric status
 Status attainment
 Status offense
 Status shift
 Status constructus, a noun form

 Status match, in frequent-flyer  loyalty programs
 Status quo
 Status symbol

Arts, entertainment, and media
 Status, a magazine edited by Igor Cassini
 Recurring status, in acting
 Status effect, in gaming

Computing
 Exit status, in computer science
 Process states (Process Status)
 Status bar, in user interface design
 Status message (instant messaging)
 Status register, in computer science

Religion
 Oratory status, in churches

Science and healthcare
 Abundance (ecology) of taxa or biota
 Conservation status of a species
 HIV test (HIV Status)
 Performance status, in medicine

Technology
 HTC Status, or HTC ChaCha,  Android smartphone by HTC
 Status tones, in telecommunication

See also
 
 
 Condition (disambiguation)
 Situation (disambiguation)
 State (disambiguation)